The Voronezh constituency (No.87) is a Russian legislative constituency in Voronezh Oblast. The constituency covers eastern half of Voronezh and its surroundings, however, in 2016 the district was altered and stretched south to Liski.

Members elected

Election results

1993

|-
! colspan=2 style="background-color:#E9E9E9;text-align:left;vertical-align:top;" |Candidate
! style="background-color:#E9E9E9;text-align:left;vertical-align:top;" |Party
! style="background-color:#E9E9E9;text-align:right;" |Votes
! style="background-color:#E9E9E9;text-align:right;" |%
|-
|style="background-color:#0085BE"|
|align=left|Viktor Davydkin
|align=left|Choice of Russia
|
|16.87%
|-
|style="background-color:"|
|align=left|Viktor Popov
|align=left|Independent
| -
|14.20%
|-
| colspan="5" style="background-color:#E9E9E9;"|
|- style="font-weight:bold"
| colspan="3" style="text-align:left;" | Total
| 
| 100%
|-
| colspan="5" style="background-color:#E9E9E9;"|
|- style="font-weight:bold"
| colspan="4" |Source:
|
|}

1995

|-
! colspan=2 style="background-color:#E9E9E9;text-align:left;vertical-align:top;" |Candidate
! style="background-color:#E9E9E9;text-align:left;vertical-align:top;" |Party
! style="background-color:#E9E9E9;text-align:right;" |Votes
! style="background-color:#E9E9E9;text-align:right;" |%
|-
|style="background-color:"|
|align=left|Ruslan Gostev
|align=left|Communist Party
|
|24.21%
|-
|style="background-color:"|
|align=left|Yevgeny Vorovyev
|align=left|Independent
|
|10.55%
|-
|style="background-color:"|
|align=left|Sergey Korolev
|align=left|Our Home – Russia
|
|8.92%
|-
|style="background-color:"|
|align=left|Viktor Davydkin (incumbent)
|align=left|Independent
|
|7.97%
|-
|style="background-color:"|
|align=left|Vladimir Kuznetsov
|align=left|Yabloko
|
|7.51%
|-
|style="background-color:"|
|align=left|Yury Khvorikov
|align=left|Liberal Democratic Party
|
|5.50%
|-
|style="background-color:#D50000"|
|align=left|Leonid Kuznetsov
|align=left|Communists and Working Russia - for the Soviet Union
|
|5.29%
|-
|style="background-color:"|
|align=left|Mikhail Chubirko
|align=left|Kedr
|
|4.76%
|-
|style="background-color:"|
|align=left|Vadim Biryuchenko
|align=left|Independent
|
|2.70%
|-
|style="background-color:#FFF22E"|
|align=left|Ivan Anchukov
|align=left|Beer Lovers Party
|
|2.38%
|-
|style="background-color:#959698"|
|align=left|Boris Skrynnikov
|align=left|Derzhava
|
|2.37%
|-
|style="background-color:"|
|align=left|Igor Shilnikov
|align=left|Independent
|
|1.62%
|-
|style="background-color:#000000"|
|colspan=2 |against all
|
|13.16%
|-
| colspan="5" style="background-color:#E9E9E9;"|
|- style="font-weight:bold"
| colspan="3" style="text-align:left;" | Total
| 
| 100%
|-
| colspan="5" style="background-color:#E9E9E9;"|
|- style="font-weight:bold"
| colspan="4" |Source:
|
|}

1999

|-
! colspan=2 style="background-color:#E9E9E9;text-align:left;vertical-align:top;" |Candidate
! style="background-color:#E9E9E9;text-align:left;vertical-align:top;" |Party
! style="background-color:#E9E9E9;text-align:right;" |Votes
! style="background-color:#E9E9E9;text-align:right;" |%
|-
|style="background-color:"|
|align=left|Ruslan Gostev (incumbent)
|align=left|Communist Party
|
|20.42%
|-
|style="background-color:"|
|align=left|Mikhail Vaytsekhovsky
|align=left|Independent
|
|16.39%
|-
|style="background-color:"|
|align=left|Vladimir Chuzhikov
|align=left|Independent
|
|11.69%
|-
|style="background-color:"|
|align=left|Sergey Chizhov
|align=left|Independent
|
|7.37%
|-
|style="background-color:"|
|align=left|Yury Bezdetko
|align=left|Yabloko
|
|5.82%
|-
|style="background-color:"|
|align=left|Boris Skrynnikov
|align=left|Independent
|
|4.93%
|-
|style="background-color:"|
|align=left|Nikolay Matveyev
|align=left|Independent
|
|4.13%
|-
|style="background-color:"|
|align=left|Vladimir Anishchev
|align=left|Independent
|
|2.96%
|-
|style="background-color:"|
|align=left|Vadim Biryuchenko
|align=left|Independent
|
|1.61%
|-
|style="background-color:"|
|align=left|Vladimir Kirillov
|align=left|Independent
|
|1.21%
|-
|style="background-color:#020266"|
|align=left|Dmitry Buylin
|align=left|Russian Socialist Party
|
|1.14%
|-
|style="background-color:#FF4400"|
|align=left|Vladimir Trishin
|align=left|Andrey Nikolayev and Svyatoslav Fyodorov Bloc
|
|0.98%
|-
|style="background-color:"|
|align=left|Vasily Voronin
|align=left|Russian All-People's Union
|
|0.95%
|-
|style="background-color:"|
|align=left|Nikolay Pripadchev
|align=left|Independent
|
|0.58%
|-
|style="background-color:"|
|align=left|Viktor Ivanov
|align=left|Independent
|
|0.38%
|-
|style="background-color:"|
|align=left|Andrey Zavidiya
|align=left|Our Home – Russia
|
|0.31%
|-
|style="background-color:"|
|align=left|Vitaly Novikov
|align=left|Independent
|
|0.24%
|-
|style="background-color:#000000"|
|colspan=2 |against all
|
|17.00%
|-
| colspan="5" style="background-color:#E9E9E9;"|
|- style="font-weight:bold"
| colspan="3" style="text-align:left;" | Total
| 
| 100%
|-
| colspan="5" style="background-color:#E9E9E9;"|
|- style="font-weight:bold"
| colspan="4" |Source:
|
|}

2003

|-
! colspan=2 style="background-color:#E9E9E9;text-align:left;vertical-align:top;" |Candidate
! style="background-color:#E9E9E9;text-align:left;vertical-align:top;" |Party
! style="background-color:#E9E9E9;text-align:right;" |Votes
! style="background-color:#E9E9E9;text-align:right;" |%
|-
|style="background-color:"|
|align=left|Sergey Chizhov
|align=left|United Russia
|
|37.24%
|-
|style="background-color:"|
|align=left|Sergey Rudakov
|align=left|Communist Party
|
|19.68%
|-
|style="background-color:"|
|align=left|Aleksandr Sysoyev
|align=left|Independent
|
|9.44%
|-
|style="background-color:#1042A5"|
|align=left|Aleksandr Boldyrev
|align=left|Union of Right Forces
|
|7.41%
|-
|style="background-color:"|
|align=left|Yulia Bashtovaya
|align=left|Liberal Democratic Party
|
|3.40%
|-
|style="background-color:"|
|align=left|Anatoly Korniyenko
|align=left|Agrarian Party
|
|2.02%
|-
|style="background-color:"|
|align=left|Vladimir Rubanov
|align=left|Independent
|
|1.64%
|-
|style="background-color:#00A1FF"|
|align=left|Leonid Vorobey
|align=left|Party of Russia's Rebirth-Russian Party of Life
|
|1.13%
|-
|style="background-color:#164C8C"|
|align=left|Aleksandr Chernikov
|align=left|United Russian Party Rus'
|
|1.12%
|-
|style="background-color:#000000"|
|colspan=2 |against all
|
|14.79%
|-
| colspan="5" style="background-color:#E9E9E9;"|
|- style="font-weight:bold"
| colspan="3" style="text-align:left;" | Total
| 
| 100%
|-
| colspan="5" style="background-color:#E9E9E9;"|
|- style="font-weight:bold"
| colspan="4" |Source:
|
|}

2016

|-
! colspan=2 style="background-color:#E9E9E9;text-align:left;vertical-align:top;" |Candidate
! style="background-color:#E9E9E9;text-align:left;vertical-align:top;" |Party
! style="background-color:#E9E9E9;text-align:right;" |Votes
! style="background-color:#E9E9E9;text-align:right;" |%
|-
|style="background-color: " |
|align=left|Arkady Ponomaryov
|align=left|United Russia
|118,980
|52.15%
|-
|style="background-color: " |
|align=left|Sergey Gavrilov
|align=left|Communist Party
|38,751
|16.98%
|-
|style="background:"|
|align=left|Galina Kudryavtseva
|align=left|Communists of Russia
|21,961
|9.63%
|-
|style="background-color: " |
|align=left|Maksim Filippov
|align=left|Liberal Democratic Party
|17,179
|7.53%
|-
|style="background-color: " |
|align=left|Artem Rymar
|align=left|A Just Russia
|11,938
|5.23%
|-
|style="background-color: " |
|align=left|Boris Skrynnikov
|align=left|Patriots of Russia
|4,921
|2.16%
|-
|style="background:"|
|align=left|Konstantin Kornev
|align=left|Party of Growth
|4,774
|2.09%
|-
|style="background:"|
|align=left|Boris Suprenok
|align=left|Yabloko
|4,047
|1.77%
|-
| colspan="5" style="background-color:#E9E9E9;"|
|- style="font-weight:bold"
| colspan="3" style="text-align:left;" | Total
| 228,154
| 100%
|-
| colspan="5" style="background-color:#E9E9E9;"|
|- style="font-weight:bold"
| colspan="4" |Source:
|
|}

2021

|-
! colspan=2 style="background-color:#E9E9E9;text-align:left;vertical-align:top;" |Candidate
! style="background-color:#E9E9E9;text-align:left;vertical-align:top;" |Party
! style="background-color:#E9E9E9;text-align:right;" |Votes
! style="background-color:#E9E9E9;text-align:right;" |%
|-
|style="background-color: " |
|align=left|Arkady Ponomaryov (incumbent)
|align=left|United Russia
|116,383
|48.83%
|-
|style="background-color: " |
|align=left|Vladimir Kalinin
|align=left|Communist Party
|42,954
|18.02%
|-
|style="background:"|
|align=left|Lyudmila Yeliseyeva
|align=left|Communists of Russia
|14,750
|6.19%
|-
|style="background-color: " |
|align=left|Nikita Berezin
|align=left|Liberal Democratic Party
|13,783
|5.78%
|-
|style="background-color: " |
|align=left|Vasily Zhabin
|align=left|New People
|13,750
|5.77%
|-
|style="background-color: " |
|align=left|Sergey Lyakhov
|align=left|A Just Russia — For Truth
|10,764
|4.52%
|-
|style="background-color: " |
|align=left|Igor Borisov
|align=left|Rodina
|10,539
|4.42%
|-
|style="background: "| 
|align=left|Sergey Shakhov
|align=left|The Greens
|5,981
|2.51%
|-
|style="background: "| 
|align=left|Aleksandr Strelnikov
|align=left|Yabloko
|3,145
|1.32%
|-
| colspan="5" style="background-color:#E9E9E9;"|
|- style="font-weight:bold"
| colspan="3" style="text-align:left;" | Total
| 238,363
| 100%
|-
| colspan="5" style="background-color:#E9E9E9;"|
|- style="font-weight:bold"
| colspan="4" |Source:
|
|}

References

References

Russian legislative constituencies
Politics of Voronezh Oblast